The Moroccan Grand Prix (Arabic: سباق الجائزة الكبرى المغربي) was a Grand Prix first organised in 1925 in Casablanca, Morocco with the official denomination of "Casablanca Grand Prix".

History
In 1930, the race was held at the new Anfa Circuit (official denomination "Anfa Grand Prix"). It claimed the life of driver Count Bruno d'Harcourt during a practice run. All winners, in touring cars, were either French or Monegasque.

There was no race in 1933 nor between 1935 and 1953. When it returned in 1954, it was held on a circuit at the city of Agadir for sports cars, and French dominance was interrupted by an Italian driver, Giuseppe Farina.

A new layout at Ain-Diab near Casablanca was made ready for the 1957 Formula One race which, although not counting toward the World Championship, attracted a world-class field. The race was won by Jean Behra for Maserati. The 1958 edition of the race was the only one to be part of the Formula One World Championship, and would be the final round of that season. The Championship battle was still alive between Mike Hawthorn of Ferrari and Stirling Moss of Vanwall. Hawthorn would finish second place to clinch the crown, despite his rival Moss winning the race. Vanwall would also clinch the inaugural Constructors Championship, but it was overshadowed by a crash involving Stuart Lewis-Evans, who died from his injuries six days later.

Winners of the Moroccan Grand Prix

Repeat winners (constructors) 
A pink background indicates an event which was not part of the Formula One World Championship.

Repeat winners (engine manufacturers) 
A pink background indicates an event which was not part of the Formula One World Championship.

By year
A pink background indicates an event which was not part of the Formula One World Championship.

References

 
Sport in Casablanca
Pre-World Championship Grands Prix
Formula One Grands Prix
National Grands Prix
Recurring sporting events established in 1925
1925 establishments in Morocco
Recurring sporting events disestablished in 1958
Motorsport competitions in Morocco
1950s disestablishments in Morocco